Mount Rex is an isolated mountain (1,105 m) which rises above the interior ice surface of Palmer Land about 55 miles south-southeast of FitzGerald Bluffs. It was discovered and photographed from the air on 23 November 1935 by Lincoln Ellsworth (Geographical Review, July 1936, p. 459, Fig. 16). The feature was resighted by the Ronne Antarctic Research Expedition (RARE) (1947–48) under Finn Ronne, who named it for Lt. Cdr. Daniel F. Rex, USN, of the Office of Naval Research, who made important contributions to the planning of the scientific research program and the equipping of the expedition.

See also
Mount Peterson, 22 nautical miles (41 km) northwest of Mount Rex

References

External links

Mountains of Palmer Land